The 2007 KNSB Dutch Allround Championships in speed skating were held in the Thialf stadium in Heerenveen, Netherlands, on 23 and 24 December 2006. Although the event took place in December 2006 this was the 2007 edition as it is part of the 2006–07 speed skating season.

Sven Kramer won the men's allround event, finishing in the top four on all distances. Erben Wennemars won bronze in his first start at an allround championship. In the women's event, Ireen Wüst won both the shortest distances, and finished on the podium in all four distances to take overall victory by almost two points.

Schedule

Medalists

Allround

Distance

Men's results

500 m

5000 m

1500 m

10,000 m

Allround results 

NQ = Not qualified for the 10,000m (only the best 12 are qualified)

Source: Schaatsstatistieken.nl 

Kramer, Verheijen, Tuitert and olde Heuvel were selected for the 2007 European Championships. Wennemars said he was not after qualifying for the European Championship, and will instead take part in the 2007 World Sprint Championships the following week.

Women's results

500 m

3000 m

1500 m

5000 m

Allround results 

NQ = Not qualified for the 5000m (only the best 12 are qualified)

Source: Schaatsstatistieken.nl 

Wüst, Groenewold, Vis and Van Deutekom were selected for the European Championships.

References

Dutch Allround Championships
Dutch Allround Championships
Knsb Dutch Allround Championships, 2007
2007 Allround
KNSB Dutch Allround Championships, 2007